Oak Hill Cemetery is a historic cemetery located at Lebanon, Boone County, Indiana.  The cemetery was established in 1872 as Rodefer Cemetery, and includes many noteworthy examples of Victorian funerary art. Other notable features are the Late Gothic style William L. Powell Chapel (1930), office building (1955), English barn, the Romanesque Revival style main gate, north gate, the original mausoleum, Metzger Mausoleum, Heath Mausoleum, and Stokes Mausoleum.  Notable burials include Indiana governor and U.S. Senator Samuel M. Ralston (1857–1925).

It was listed on the National Register of Historic Places in 2014.

Notable burials
Noteworthy burials at the cemetery include:
 Thomas Jefferson Cason (1828–1901), US Congressman
 Sylvia Likens (1949–1965), torture-murder victim
 Samuel M. Ralston (1857–1925), Indiana governor and U.S. Senator

References

External links
 
 
 

Cemeteries on the National Register of Historic Places in Indiana
Gothic Revival architecture in Indiana
Romanesque Revival architecture in Indiana
1872 establishments in Indiana
Buildings and structures in Boone County, Indiana
National Register of Historic Places in Boone County, Indiana